The  is an interchange of the Tōmei Expressway in Gotemba, Shizuoka, Japan, with expressway bus station. This is one of the gateways to the Mount Fuji and Hakone areas.

Roads
 Tōmei Expressway
 National Route 138
 Shizuoka prefectural route 401

History
The interchange opened on March 31, 1969

Around
 Gotemba Premium Outlets
 JR Gotemba Station
 Mount Fuji
 Fuji Five Lakes (includes Lake Yamanaka and Lake Kawaguchi)
 Fuji Speedway
 Hakone (Lake Ashi)

Bus station

 is a bus terminal, located in the Gotemba Interchange, managed by Central Nippon Expressway Company.

Outline
The bus station has two platforms, for expressway bus and local routes, located about 1 kilometer southeast of JR Gotemba Station.

Bus services
Expressway bus (daytime)
for JR Tokyo Station, JR Shizuoka Station, JR Nagoya Station, by JR Bus (JR Bus Kanto, JR Bus Tech, JR Tokai Bus) 
for JR Kyoto Station, JR Osaka Station, by JR Bus (JR Bus Kanto, West Japan JR Bus)
for Shinjuku Station (in Tokyo), by Odakyu Hakone Highway Bus
for Haneda Airport via JR Yokohama Station, by Odakyu Hakone Highway Bus (leaves from Odakyu Hakone Highway Bus Gotemba Branch, the other side of the road : joint operation with Keikyu Bus)
Local routes
for Gotemba Premium Outlets, by Free Shuttle Bus
for Hakone Togendai (Lake Ashi) via JR Gotemba Station (transfer for JR Gotemba Line, bus for Mount Fuji, Fuji Five Lakes), Otome Toge, and Sengoku (transfer for Gora Station, Miyanoshita, Hakone Yumoto Station, and Odawara Station), by Odakyu Hakone Highway Bus
for Hakone Ten-yu via Otome Toge, Sengoku (transfer for Miyanoshita, Hakone Yumoto Station, and Odawara Station), Gora Station, Hakone Open-Air Museum, and Yunessun, by Hakone Tozan Bus

References

External links
 Central Nippon Expressway Company  (official website)
 Japan Expressway Bus Net (JR Group Expressway Bus information & reservation)
 JR Bus Kanto (official website) 

Roads in Shizuoka Prefecture
Gotemba, Shizuoka
Mount Fuji
Hakone, Kanagawa
Road interchanges in Japan
1969 establishments in Japan